Protosynaema matutina is a species of moth in the family Plutellidae first described by Alfred Philpott in 1928. It is endemic to New Zealand.

References

Moths described in 1928
Moths of New Zealand
Plutellidae
Endemic fauna of New Zealand
Taxa named by Alfred Philpott
Endemic moths of New Zealand